Magnasco is a surname. Notable people with the surname include:

Alessandro Magnasco (1667–1749), Italian Baroque painter
Marcelo Magnasco (born 1958), Argentine fencer
Marcelo Osvaldo Magnasco (born 1963), Argentine biophysicist
Stefano Magnasco (born 1992), Chilean footballer

Surnames of Italian origin